Western Greece Region is one of the thirteen administrative regions of Greece. It comprises the western part of continental Greece and the northwestern part of the Peloponnese peninsula. The capital of the Western Greece is Patras, the third-largest-city in the country with a population of about 280,000 inhabitants. The NUTS 2 code for the region of Western Greece is EL63.

Administration 
The region of Western Greece was established in the 1987 administrative reform. With the 2010 Kallikratis plan, its powers and authority were redefined and extended. Along with Peloponnese and the Ionian Islands regions, it is supervised by the Decentralized Administration of Peloponnese, Western Greece and the Ionian Islands based at Patras. The region is based at Patras and is divided into three regional units (pre-Kallikratis prefectures), Aetolia-Acarnania in Central Greece and Achaea and Elis in Peloponnese, which are further subdivided into 19 municipalities.

Climate 
The region has hot summers and mild winters. Sunny days dominate during the summer months in areas within the beaches and partially cloudy and rainy in the mountains. Snow is very common during the winter in the mountains of Erymanthus, Panachaiko and Aroania. Winter high temperatures are around the 10 °C mark throughout the low-lying areas.

Economy 
The Gross domestic product (GDP) of the region was 8.3 billion € in 2018, accounting for 4.5% of Greek economic output. GDP per capita adjusted for purchasing power was 15,200 € or 50% of the EU27 average in the same year. The GDP per employee was 65% of the EU average.

Demographics
The region has shrunk by 36,447 people between 2011 and 2021, experiencing a population loss of 5.4%.

Major communities
 Missolonghi (Μεσολόγγι)
 Agrinio (Αγρίνιο)
 Aigio (Αίγιο)
 Amaliada (Αμαλιάδα)
 Patras (Πάτρα)
 Pyrgos (Πύργος)
 Nafpaktos (Ναύπακτος)

Gallery

References

External links

  

 
NUTS 2 statistical regions of the European Union
States and territories established in 1987
Administrative regions of Greece